Victor James Shaw (10 March 1875 – 14 June 1936) was an Australian politician.

He was born in Cressy. In 1925 he was elected to the Tasmanian House of Assembly as a Labor member for Bass. He was appointed Labor whip in 1929. He held the seat until his death in 1936.

References

1875 births
1936 deaths
Members of the Tasmanian House of Assembly
Australian Labor Party members of the Parliament of Tasmania